Bianca Melina Elisabeth Wahlgren Ingrosso (born 30 December 1994) is a Swedish blogger, social influencer, entrepreneur, and singer.

Career

Performances 
Ingrosso participated in the Swedish national selection for the Junior Eurovision Song Contest 2006 alongside friend Malin Eriksson. Their song, "Kan det bli vi två", finished in second place. She performed as Louisa von Trapp in a 2007 run of the musical The Sound of Music held at Göta Lejon theatre. In 2008, she participated in the Astrid Lindgren based musical Hujeda mig så många sånger, alongside her brother Benjamin Ingrosso and under the direction of her uncle, Linus Wahlgren. Ingrosso was a contestant on Let's Dance 2016, ultimately placing second in the final against Elisa Lindström.

Judge 
She served as a talent judge on Talang, from 2018–2022.

Reality television 
Ingrosso participates in the Kanal 5 television series Wahlgrens värld along with her mother Pernilla. The reality series debuted in the fall of 2016, and it documents the lives and work of their family. In late 2021, it was announced that Ingrosso would no longer appear on the series but instead focus on her other work projects.

Podcast 
In 2017, Ingrosso and Alice Stenlöf debut their podcast' Alice & Bianca – Har du sagt A får du säga B which lasted until August 2019.

She presented an episode of Sommar i P1 broadcast on Sveriges Radio in 2018, were she spoke about her life.

Award 
Ingrosso and her mother Pernilla won the TV personality award at Kristallen 2018.

Personal life 
Bianca Ingrosso is the daughter of Pernilla Wahlgren and Emilio Ingrosso, the granddaughter of Christina Schollin and Hans Wahlgren, niece of Charlotte Perrelli, and a cousin of Sebastian Ingrosso.

Discography

Singles

References

External links 

 Official blog 
 
 
 

1994 births
Living people
Swedish people of Italian descent
Singers from Stockholm
21st-century Swedish singers
21st-century Swedish women singers